Group 2 of the 2017 UEFA European Under-21 Championship qualifying competition consisted of six teams: Italy, Serbia, Slovenia, Republic of Ireland, Lithuania, and Andorra. The composition of the nine groups in the qualifying group stage was decided by the draw held on 5 February 2015.

The group was played in home-and-away round-robin format. The group winners qualified directly for the final tournament, while the runners-up advanced to the play-offs if they were one of the four best runners-up among all nine groups (not counting results against the sixth-placed team).

Standings

Matches
Times are CEST (UTC+2) for dates between 29 March and 24 October 2015 and between 27 March and 29 October 2016, for other dates times are CET (UTC+1).

Goalscorers
8 goals

 Uroš Đurđević

4 goals

 Ognjen Ožegović

3 goals

 Marco Benassi
 Callum O'Dowda
 Sergej Milinković-Savić
 Žiga Kastrevec
 Andraž Šporar
 Leo Štulac

2 goals

 Alberto Cerri
 Federico Di Francesco
 Gaetano Monachello
 Sean Maguire
 Conor Wilkinson
 Aleksandar Čavrić
 Andrija Luković
 Jon Gorenc Stanković
 Dino Hotić

1 goal

 Aarón Sánchez
 Domenico Berardi
 Federico Bernardeschi
 Danilo Cataldi
 Vittorio Parigini
 Lorenzo Pellegrini
 Alessio Romagnoli
 Lorenzo Rosseti
 Donatas Kazlauskas
 Manfredas Ruzgis
 Gratas Sirgėdas
 Lukas Spalvis
 Simonas Stankevičius
 Alan Browne
 Harry Charsley
 Dylan Connolly
 Josh Cullen
 Courtney Duffus
 Tommie Hoban
 Srđan Babić
 Mijat Gaćinović
 Milan Gajić
 Darko Lazić
 Saša Lukić
 Nikola Maraš
 Nemanja Mihajlović
 Fejsal Mulić
 Gregor Bajde
 Luka Krajnc
 Mitja Lotrič
 Luka Zahović
 Miha Zajc

1 own goal

 Rolando Mandragora (against Republic of Ireland)
 Darragh Lenihan (against Italy)

References

External links
Standings and fixtures at UEFA.com

Group 2